Abu Halifa District is one of the districts of Al Ahmadi Governorate in Kuwait. As of 2018 the district's population was estimated at 60,470.

References

Districts of Al Ahmadi Governorate